The 2013 CNBC Prime's The Profit 200 was the 17th stock car race of the 2013 NASCAR Nationwide Series and the 24th iteration of the event. The race was held on Saturday, July 13, 2013, in Loudon, New Hampshire, at New Hampshire Motor Speedway a 1.058 miles (1.703 km) permanent, oval-shaped, low-banked racetrack. The race was extended from its scheduled 200 laps to 2013 due to multiple green–white–checker finishes. At race's end, Kyle Busch, driving for Joe Gibbs Racing, would defend the field on a drama-filled final restart to complete a dominant run in the race. The win was Busch's 58th career NASCAR Nationwide Series win and his seventh win of the season. To fill out the podium, Brian Vickers of Joe Gibbs Racing and Austin Dillon of Richard Childress Racing would finish second and third, respectively.

Background 

New Hampshire Motor Speedway is a 1.058-mile (1.703 km) oval speedway located in Loudon, New Hampshire, which has hosted NASCAR racing annually since the early 1990s, as well as the longest-running motorcycle race in North America, the Loudon Classic. Nicknamed "The Magic Mile", the speedway is often converted into a 1.6-mile (2.6 km) road course, which includes much of the oval.

The track was originally the site of Bryar Motorsports Park before being purchased and redeveloped by Bob Bahre. The track is currently one of eight major NASCAR tracks owned and operated by Speedway Motorsports.

Entry list 

 (R) denotes rookie driver.
 (i) denotes driver who is ineligible for series driver points.

*Withdrew to qualify for Dexter Stacey.

Practice

First practice 
The first practice session was held on Friday, July 12, at 11:00 AM EST, and would last for 50 minutes.

Second and final practice 
The second and final practice session, sometimes referred to as Happy Hour, was held on Friday, July 12, at 1:40 PM EST, and would last for one hour and 20 minutes.

Qualifying 
Qualifying was held on Saturday, July 13, at 10:05 AM EST. Each driver would have two laps to set a fastest time; the fastest of the two would count as their official qualifying lap.

Two drivers would fail to qualify: Morgan Shepherd and Mike Harmon.

Full qualifying results

Race results

References 

2013 NASCAR Nationwide Series
NASCAR races at New Hampshire Motor Speedway
July 2013 sports events in the United States
2013 in sports in New Hampshire